Iltjan Nika (born 23 March 1995) is an Albanian road cyclist, who last rode for UCI Continental team . Nika is best known for winning the bronze medal in the 2013 UCI World Junior Road Race Championships.

Major results

2013
 1st  Road race, National Junior Road Championships
 1st  National Junior Cyclo-Cross Championships
 3rd Road race, UCI Junior Road World Championships
2014
 National Road Championships
1st  Time trial
2nd Road race
2015
 National Under-23 Road Championships
1st  Road race
1st  Time trial
2016
 2nd Road race, National Road Championships
 3rd Balkan Elite Road Classics
2017
 1st  Time trial, National Road Championships

References

External links

1995 births
Living people
Albanian male cyclists
People from Pukë